Prince Alexander Alexandrovich Prozorovsky (tr. ; 1733 – 21 August 1809) was the only Field Marshal from the Prozorovsky family.

Biography
Prozorovsky gained distinction in the Seven Years' War and the conquest of Crimea. Prozorovsky's career was furthered by his maternal Galitzine relatives, who helped him to get appointed to the office of Kursk's governor in 1780. He resigned two years later and spent the following years at his country estates.

In 1790 Prozorovsky returned to the active service as the Governor General of Moscow. Emperor Paul, however, couldn't get along with him and discharged Prozorovsky from his office. His ancient services were recalled in 1808, when the Russian army resumed its hostilities against Turkey, and Prozorovsky became its Commander-in-Chief.

Prozorovsky's reputation suffered a blow when his attempt to  storm of Brailov ended in his army being repelled at enormous loss of life on Russian side. The old and ailing general asked Alexander I to dispatch a younger and more energetic Mikhail Kutuzov to his aid.

Two months later, when Prozorovsky's army was crossing the Danube, the Field-Marshal died. His body was transported to St Petersburg and interred in the Alexander Nevsky Lavra.

References

Prozorovsky, Alexander
Prozorovsky, Alexander
Prozorovsky, Alexander
Prozorovsky, Alexander
18th-century military personnel from the Russian Empire
Prozorovsky, Alexander
Recipients of the Order of St. George of the Second Degree
Recipients of the Order of St. George of the Third Degree